Sylvan Hills is a historic intown neighborhood in southwest Atlanta, Georgia, United States.

Sylva, Latin for “forest”, describes the dense tree canopy that shades the streets and homes of Sylvan Hills.

Boundaries
The neighborhood is bordered on the north by Deckner Avenue, on the south by Langford Parkway (Hwy 166), to the east by I-75/85 and on the west by Murphy Avenue.

The area that is now Sylvan Hills was once part of the Perkerson and Gilbert holdings that are believed to date to 1831.

Housing development began in Sylvan Hills about 1920 during post-World War I growth. The housing boom tapered off during the Great Depression and started up again after World War II, lasting until the neighborhood was completely developed.

In April 1922, J.R. Smith & M.S. Rankin published an article in The Atlanta Constitution newspaper about their new subdivision to be developed on 100 acres in southwest Atlanta to be called "Sylvan Hills". The property was located on what was then South Ashby Road (soon to be renamed Sylvan Road). The land was advertised to be nearly as level as a floor and situated in a forest of poplar, oak and hickory. The conveniences they associated with this new subdivision included: proximity to schools and churches, paved streets, paved sidewalks, water and sewer, two nearby trolley lines and its location within the city limits. The subdivision was to have few restrictions, however, those restrictions included the following: "A 25 foot building line [setback] must be maintained; It is to be used exclusively for white people; [and] None of the properties can be used for stores or other commercial purposes." The property was subdivided into 50 x 150 ft lots and prices for these lots ranged from $775 to $1350.

By mid-1923, sales of lots and the building of homes were well underway. Advertisements from that period promoted the Sylvan Hills subdivision as 
"This splendid tract of gently rolling woodland is most appropriately named because over its entire extent the gracefully undulating knolls are covered with majestic forest trees, shading the hills and vales during the summer season, and furnishing much protection from winter blasts."

In May 1924, H. A. Spencer of Norfolk, Virginia, announced the implementation of a "Cross-Town Bus" system that would run from Morningside to Sylvan Hills. The fare for riding the ten modern motor buses was 10 cents. Spencer is credited as being the originator of the cross-town bus system.

Home Beautiful Show Atlanta

Among the open houses for the 1925 Home Beautiful Show was a house located in Sylvan Hills on Melrose Drive (shown above). The house listed for $7,000 and was built by Wagar & Company.

By July 1925, 135 lots had been sold in Sylvan Hills. The subdivision was touted as: "One of the showplaces of the southside metropolitan section.... just a comfortable distance from industrial centers." Its proximity to the city of Atlanta was also listed as an advantage, being reached easily via Sylvan Road, to Dill Avenue and then along Lee - all of which were paved roads, a huge amenity at the time. Road and infrastructure improvements were being made on Woodbourne Drive, Harte Drive and Mickleberry Street to accommodate the demand for lots.

The Sun Rises in Morningside and Sets in Sylvan Hills

Although the Morningside community became a more popularly known community, the Sylvan Hills and neighboring Capitol View Manor neighborhoods shared a few common ties.  In 1926, the real estate agency of Maddox & Tisinger sold properties in all three neighborhoods.  Additionally, prominent developer James Jackson built many homes in Morningside and Sylvan Hills. Jackson's homes were known for their superior craftsmanship and intricate use of modern materials.

Sylvan Hills also featured homes constructed by respected developer R. M. Cole. The promotional article for Cole published in 1925 talks about how his houses were the prettiest in Sylvan Hills. Cole shared with developer James Jackson a similar emphasis on the use of premium materials and highly skilled workmanship, attracting homeowners in search of more affluent amenities.

By mid-1927, the Sylvan Hills Improvement Club had been established and met on Deckner Avenue. One of the priority projects for the club was to secure land for a park to serve the residents of the growing Sylvan Hills subdivision. The property that was secured belonged to the Perkerson family and comprised 370 acres. At the time, only two buildings existed on the property that were deemed of importance—the Perkerson home and a Fulton county school. The property was soon purchased and developed into a city park, with the contingency that the Perkerson home remain in ownership of the family during the remainder of their lives. City notables in favor of the project included: Mayor James L. Key, Alderman Charles M. Ford, Judge T.O. Hathcock, Frank Callaway, T.B. Hopkins, and T.H. Goodwin.

At one time, there was a center of shops, including a movie theater, at Dill Avenue and Sylvan Road. Shops along the railroad tracks attracted personnel from nearby Fort McPherson.

Places of interest

Perkerson Park
Perkerson Park is approximately 50 acres in size and is located in the northeast portion of the neighborhood at the corner of Deckner Avenue and Beatie Avenue Southwest.

Fort McPherson
Fort McPherson, colloquially known as "Fort Mac", while technically located in East Point, Georgia, is a U.S. military installation situated just west of Murphy Street, on the western border of the Sylvan Hills community. It was closed when BRAC went into effect, and many organizations made inquiries to the McPherson Implementing Local Redevelopment Authority (MILRA) with intentions to develop the property.  In 2015, billionaire entertainment mogul Tyler Perry purchased 330 acres of Fort McPherson's 500 acre property for the development of the new home of Tyler Perry Studios.

Lakewood/Fort McPherson MARTA Station layout

Economy
The Crossroads Shopping Center, better known by its former name, the Stewart-Lakewood Center, is located in Sylvan Hills.

Gentrification

Since 2010, Sylvan Hills has become increasingly impacted by gentrification primarily due to its proximity to the city's revitalized central business district, Midtown, Hartsfield–Jackson Atlanta International Airport, Tyler Perry Studios, Atlanta colleges and universities, and the BeltLine. 
 Sylvan Hills has been deemed an official Beltline neighborhood which positively impacted the neighborhood's appeal.

Neighborhood Association
The official neighborhood association is the Sylvan Hills Neighborhood Association (SHNA) which strives to represent the best interests of property owners and residents in Sylvan Hills.

Public education
Located within Sylvan Hills

Elementary school
Perkerson Elementary School

2895 Lakewood Ave SW

Atlanta, GA 30315-5809

Middle school
Sylvan Hills Middle School

1461 Sylvan Rd SW

Atlanta, GA 30310-4124

Located outside Sylvan Hills

High school
Carver Early College

55 McDonough Blvd SE

Atlanta, GA 30315

External links
 The Sylvan Hills Neighborhood Association
 Google Map link to the neighborhood
 An out-of-date link to the City's page on Perkerson Park
 An article on the neighborhood from Creative Loafing
 The Wikipedia article on the Belt Line Project which will extend down to Sylvan Hills
 The official page for the Belt Line

References

Neighborhoods in Atlanta